The Zircons was a singing musical group in the late 1950s and 1960s with various line-ups.

Zircons (1959–1963) 
Vocal doo wop group from East Harlem, New York Active between 1959 and 1964. The original members of The Zircons (spelled with a c) included:
Jimmy Gerenetski (lead)
Neil Colello 
John Loiacono
Ken Pulicine
Donald Lewis
Their biggest hit was a 1963 cover of "Lonely Way", The Sky-liner's 1959 recording. They followed it up with "Your Way" on Mellow mood Records.

The Zircons (1964–1967) 

In 1964, six singers from Bronx, New York, formed an a cappella (or doo-wop) group. The Zircons (spelt with k) had the following line-up:
Mario Ibanez (lead)
Carlos Infant (baritone)
Leo Perez (1st tenor)
Robert McInerney (2nd tenor)
Neal Stuart (Schoenberg) (1st/2nd tenor, falsetto lead)
Barry Zakir (baritone)

The Zircons recorded on various record labels, including Old Timer / Cat-Time / Catamount / Amber (as The Zircons) and on Snowflake Records (as The Zirkons).

Their repertory included:
1964: "You Are My Sunshine", "Silver Bells" and "Stormy Weather" [Old Timer Records]
1965: "Blue Moon", "Remember Then", "Unchained Melody", "You Baby You" [Catamount Records]
1966: "One Summer Night", "Lone Stranger"
1967: "Here in My Heart"

Other Zircons/Zircon's songs included "Come Dance With Me", "Crazy For You", "Glory of Love", "My Own True Love", "Never", "Blue Moon", "Once In A While", "Sincerely", "Smile", and "Sunday Kind Of Love", "The Wind”

The Zircon's have been nominated in the category Legend Vocal Group Acapella 1950-1970’s by the East Coast Music Hall of Fame for 2020/2021.

References

Further reading 
 J. Santiago, Steven J. Dunham, and Jerry Lawson, Capella Street Corner Vocal Groups: A Brief History and Discography of 1960s Singing Groups, Mellow Sound Press (2006), 
 Dr. Anthony J. Grebin & Dr. Matthew M. Schiff, The Complete Book of Doo Wop, Collectables (2006), 

Doo-wop groups
Entertainers from the Bronx
Musical groups from New York City